Darryl Tillman (born April 27, 1967) is a former American football wide receiver in the Arena Football League. He played for the New Orleans Night, Dallas Texans and Las Vegas Sting. Tillman played college football at Southern Mississippi.

References

1967 births
Living people
People from Wiggins, Mississippi
Players of American football from Mississippi
American football wide receivers
Southern Miss Golden Eagles football players
New Orleans Night players
Dallas Texans (Arena) players
Las Vegas Sting players